This is a list of towns and villages in Montana Province, Bulgaria.

The place names in bold have the status of town (in Bulgarian: град, transliterated: grad) and the other localities have the status of village (in Bulgarian: село, transliterated: selo). These names use the Latin alphabet and link to the English Wikipedia article (where available); they are followed in parentheses by the original name in the Bulgarian Cyrillic alphabet which links to the Bulgarian Wikipedia article.

   Asparuhovo (Аспарухово)
   Balyuvitsa (Балювица)
   Barzia (Бързия)
   Beli Breg (Бели брег)
   Beli Brod (Бели брод)
   Belimel (Белимел)
   Belotintsi (Белотинци)
Berkovitsa (Берковица)
   Bezdenitsa (Безденица)
   Bistrilitsa (Бистрилица)
   Blagovo (Благово)
   Bokilovtsi (Бокиловци)
   Borovtsi (Боровци)
   Botevo (Ботево)
Boychinovtsi (Бойчиновци)
Brusartsi (Брусарци)
   Bukovets (Буковец)
   Buzovets (Бъзовец)
   Chelyustnitsa (Челюстница)
   Chemish (Чемиш)
   Chereshovitsa (Черешовица)
   Cherkaski (Черкаски)
   Cherni Vrah (Черни връх)
Chiprovtsi (Чипровци)
   Dabova mahala (Дъбова махала)
   Dalgi Del (Дълги дел)
   Dalgodeltsi (Дългоделци)
   Diva Slatina (Дива Слатина)
   Dobri dol (Добри дол)
   Doktor Yosifovo (Доктор Йосифово)
   Dolna Bela Rechka (Долна Бела речка)
   Dolna Riksa (Долна Рикса)
   Dolna Verenitsa (Долна Вереница)
   Dolni Tsibar (Долни Цибър)
   Dolno Belotintsi (Долно Белотинци)
   Dolno Linevo (Долно Линево)
   Dolno Ozirovo (Долно Озирово)
   Dolno Tserovene (Долно Церовене)
   Dondukovo (Дондуково)
   Draganitsa (Драганица)
   Elovitsa (Еловица)
   Erden (Ерден)
   Gabrovnitsa (Габровница)
   Gaganitsa (Гаганица)
   Gavril Genovo (Гаврил Геново)
   Georgi Damyanovo (Георги Дамяново)
   Glavanovtsi (Главановци)
   Gorna Bela Rechka (Горна Бела речка)
   Gorna Kovachitsa (Горна Ковачица)
   Gorna Luka (Горна Лука)
   Gorna Verenitsa (Горна Вереница)
   Gorni Tsibar (Горни Цибър)
   Gorno Ozirovo (Горно Озирово)
   Gorno Tserovene (Горно Церовене)
   Govezhda (Говежда)
   Gromshin (Громшин)
   Ignatovo (Игнатово)
   Kamenna Riksa (Каменна Рикса)
   Kiselevo (Киселево)
   Klisuritsa (Клисурица)
   Knyazheva mahala (Княжева махала)
   Kobilyak (Кобиляк)
   Komarevo (Комарево)
   Komoshtitsa (Комощица)
   Kopilovtsi (Копиловци)
   Kostentsi (Костенци)
   Kotenovtsi (Котеновци)
   Kovachitsa (Ковачица)
   Krapchene (Крапчене)
   Kriva bara (Крива бара)
   Lehchevo (Лехчево)
   Leskovets (Лесковец)
   Lipen (Липен)
Lom (Лом)
   Madan (Мадан)
   Marchevo (Мърчево)
   Martinovo (Мартиново)
   Medkovets (Медковец)
   Melyane (Меляне)
   Mezdreya (Мездрея)
   Mitrovtsi (Митровци)
   Mokresh (Мокреш)
Montana (Монтана)
   Nikolovo (Николово)
   Odorovtsi (Одоровци)
   Ohrid (Охрид)
   Orsoya (Орсоя)
   Palilula (Палилула)
   Parlichevo (Пърличево)
   Pesochnitsa (Песочница)
   Pishurka (Пишурка)
   Pomezhdin (Помеждин)
   Portitovtsi (Портитовци)
   Prevala (Превала)
   Rashovitsa (Рашовица)
   Rasovo (Расово)
   Ravna (Равна)
   Razgrad (Разград)
   Septemvriytsi (Септемврийци)
   Slatina (Слатина)
   Slavotin (Славотин)
   Slivata (Сливата)
   Slivovik (Сливовик)
   Smirnenski (Смирненски)
   Smolyanovtsi (Смоляновци)
   Spanchevtsi (Спанчевци)
   Staliyska mahala (Сталийска махала)
   Stanevo (Станево)
   Stoyanovo (Стояново)
   Stubel (Стубел)
   Studeno buche (Студено буче)
   Sumer (Сумер)
   Traykovo (Трайково)
   Trifonovo (Трифоново)
   Tsvetkova bara (Цветкова бара)
Valchedram (Вълчедръм)
Varshets (Вършец)
   Vasilovtsi (Василовци)
   Vidlitsa (Видлица)
   Vinishte (Винище)
   Virove (Вирове)
   Vladimirovo (Владимирово)
   Voynitsi (Войници)
   Yagodovo (Ягодово)
   Yakimovo (Якимово)
   Zamfir (Замфир)
   Zamfirovo (Замфирово)
   Zhelezna (Железна)
   Zlatiya (Златия)

References

See also
Provinces of Bulgaria
Municipalities of Bulgaria
List of cities and towns in Bulgaria
List of villages in Bulgaria
Romanization of Bulgarian

 
Montana